Aşağı Əmirxanlı (also, Ashagy Emirkhanly) is a village in the Shabran Rayon of Azerbaijan.

References 

Populated places in Shabran District